Oxycheilopsis is an extinct genus of beetles in the family Cicindelidae, containing only one known species, Oxycheilopsis cretacicus . It is known from the Early Cretaceous (Aptian) Santana Formation of Brazil.

References

↑
Fossil taxa described in 2004
Prehistoric beetles